Live at the Palladium is a live album by Elkie Brooks, recorded in 1978 at the London Palladium. It was released on cassette in 1999 and on CD in 2000 by JAM Records.

The album was a fan club-only release and therefore not chart eligible.

Personnel 
Elkie Brooks – vocals
Jean Roussel – keyboards
Simon Bell, Barry St.John, Larry Steele, Robert Lindop vocals 
Trevor Morais – drums

Elkie Brooks albums
Fan-club-release albums
1999 compilation albums
1999 live albums